In molecular biology, the DHH phosphatase family is a family of putative phosphoesterases. The family includes Drosophila prune protein and bacterial RecJ exonuclease. The RecJ protein of Escherichia coli plays an important role in a number of DNA repair and recombination pathways. RecJ catalyses processive degradation of single-stranded DNA in a 5'-to-3' direction. Sequences highly related to those encoding RecJ can be found in many of the eubacterial genomes sequenced to date.

References 

Protein families